Perception is the process of attaining awareness or understanding of sensory information.
It can also be explained as how a person feels towards something.

Perception or Perceptions may also refer to:

Music
 Perception (Art Farmer album), a 1961 jazz album
 Perception (Blessid Union of Souls album), a 2005 alternative rock album
 Perception (Connie Crothers album), a 1974 jazz album
 Perception (The Doors album), a 2006 box set
 Perceptions (Dizzy Gillespie album), a 1962 jazz album
 Perceptions (EP), an experimental album by VersaEmerge
 Perceptions (This Beautiful Republic album), a 2008 Christian rock album
 Perception (NF album), a 2017 rap album
 Perceptual (album), a Brian Blade album

Television
 Perception (American TV series), an American crime drama starring Eric McCormack

Other
 Machine perception, the capability of a computer system to interpret data in a manner that is similar to humans
 Perception (journal), a UK scientific journal investigating perception
 Perception (company), a media entertainment company
 Perception (video game), a 2017 adventure video game